Adama François Sene (born 30 November 1989 in Dakar) is a Senegalese footballer who plays as a centre back for Al Shamal.

Sene previously played for Boavista F.C. in the Liga de Honra and Vitória F.C. in the Primeira Liga. In 2011, he moved to Beijing Guoan F.C. in the Chinese Super League. In  July 2013, he returned to Portugal, joining his previous club Vitória Setúbal.

References

1989 births
Living people
Senegalese footballers
Primeira Liga players
Boavista F.C. players
Vitória F.C. players
Beijing Guoan F.C. players
Hajer FC players
Khaleej FC players
Al-Shamal SC players
Expatriate footballers in Qatar
Chinese Super League players
Senegalese expatriate footballers
Expatriate footballers in Portugal
Expatriate footballers in China
Expatriate footballers in Saudi Arabia
Senegalese expatriate sportspeople in Saudi Arabia
Saudi Professional League players
Qatari Second Division players
Association football central defenders